The third Cabinet of Danish Prime Minister Anders Fogh Rasmussen was announced on 23 November 2007.

Changes from the Cabinet of Anders Fogh Rasmussen II
 Former Minister of Finances Thor Pedersen did instead of his old post take the seat as Speaker of Parliament, formerly held by Christian Mejdahl.
 Minister of Education and Ecclesiastical Affairs Bertel Haarder is retained as Minister of Education, but changes his second portfolio to being Minister of Nordic Cooperation.
 Social Minister and Minister of Equal Rights Karen Jespersen becomes minister of a new Welfare Ministry, merging the former Ministry of Interior Affairs, Ministry of Family and Consumer Affairs and Social Ministry into one.
 Former Interior and Health Minister Lars Løkke Rasmussen is appointed Minister of Finances.
 Former Minister of Environmental Affairs and Nordic Cooperation Connie Hedegaard is appointed Minister of Climate and Energy, thus splitting the former Ministry of Environmental Affairs up into two parts, the "traditional" Ministry of Environmental Affairs being taken over by newcomer Troels Lund Poulsen.
 Former Minister of Family and Consumer Affairs Carina Christensen is appointed new Minister of Transportation.
 Former Minister of Transportation Jakob Axel Nielsen is appointed new Minister of Health and Preventional Measures.
 Seasoned veteran Birthe Rønn Hornbech is appointed new Minister of Refugees, Immigrants and Integration along with Minister of Ecclesiastical Affairs.

List of ministers and portfolios
Some periods in the table below start before 18 February 2005 or end after 23 November 2007 because the minister was also in the Cabinet of Anders Fogh Rasmussen I or III.

References 

 Regeringen Anders Fogh Rasmussen III – from the official website of the Folketing
Ændringer i regeringen (2008-09-10). Ministry of the State of Denmark . Retrieved on 2008-09-18.

External links
Society of Opportunities, Government Platform 2007. Ministry of the State of Denmark.

2007 establishments in Denmark
Rasmussen, Anders Fogh 3
Anders Fogh Rasmussen
2009 disestablishments in Denmark
Cabinets established in 2007
Cabinets disestablished in 2009